Ajai Kumar Sonkar is an Indian independent research scientist known for his discovery of black pearls. He currently serves as the chairman of the Pearl Aquaculture Research Foundation and principal investigator of the research mission in this field.

His research papers have been published in national as well as international journals such as Aquaculture Europe, Infofish International and World Aquaculture.

The Government of India awarded him the third highest civilian honor of the Padma Bhushan, in 2022, for his outstanding achievements in the field of pearl culture.

He is known for his work in developing pearl making techniques using state-of-the-art tissue culture which earned him worldwide recognition.

References 

Living people
Recipients of the Padma Shri
Indian award winners